Cameraria eppelsheimii is a moth of the family Gracillariidae. It is known from Texas, United States.

The larvae feed on Carya species. They mine the leaves of their host plant. The mine has the form of a blotch mine on the upperside of the leaf.

References

Cameraria (moth)

Moths of North America
Lepidoptera of the United States
Leaf miners
Moths described in 1878
Taxa named by Heinrich Frey
Taxa named by Jacob Boll